Strawn is a surname. Notable people with the surname include:

Brad Strawn, American psychologist and theologian
Joshua Strawn (born 1976), American musician, songwriter, and record producer
Matt Strawn (born 1974), American businessman and politician
Silas H. Strawn (1866–1946), American lawyer